Umifenovir, sold under the brand name Arbidol, is an antiviral medication for the treatment of influenza and COVID infections used in Russia and China. The drug is manufactured by Pharmstandard. It is not approved by the U.S. Food and Drug Administration (FDA) for the treatment or prevention of influenza.

Chemically, umifenovir features an indole core, functionalized at all but one positions with different substituents. The drug has been shown in studies to inhibit viral entry into target cells  and stimulate the immune response.

Status 

Testing of umifenovir's efficacy has mainly occurred in China and Russia, and it is well known in these two countries. Some of the Russian tests showed the drug to be effective and a direct comparison with oseltamivir showed similar efficiency in vitro and in a clinical setting. In 2010 Arbidol was the drug brand with the highest sales volume in Russia. In the first quarter of 2020 it had a 16 percent share in the Russian antiviral market.

Mode of action

Biochemistry 
Umifenovir inhibits membrane fusion of influenza virus.  Umifenovir prevents contact between the virus and target host cells. Fusion between the viral envelope (surrounding the viral capsid) and the cell membrane of the target cell is inhibited. This prevents viral entry to the target cell, and therefore protects it from infection.

Some evidence suggests that the drug's actions are more effective at preventing infections from RNA viruses than infections from DNA viruses.

As well as specific antiviral action against both influenza A and influenza B viruses, umifenovir exhibits modulatory effects on the immune system. The drug stimulates a humoral immune response, induces interferon-production, and stimulates the phagocytic function of macrophages.

Clinical application 

Umifenovir is used primarily as an antiviral treatment for influenza. The drug has also been investigated as a candidate drug for treatment of hepatitis C.

More recent studies indicate that umifenovir also has in vitro effectiveness at preventing entry of Zaire ebolavirus (Kikwit strain), Tacaribe arenavirus and Kaposi's sarcoma-associated herpesvirus in mammalian cell cultures, while confirming umifenovir's suppressive effect in vitro on Hepatitis B and poliovirus infection of mammalian cells when introduced either in advance of viral infection or during infection.

Side effects 
Side effects in children include sensitization to the drug. No known overdose cases have been reported and allergic reactions are limited to people with hypersensitivity. The  is more than 4 g/kg.

Criticism 
In 2007, the Russian Academy of Medical Sciences stated that the effects of Arbidol (umifenovir) are not scientifically proven.

Russian media criticized lobbying attempts by Tatyana Golikova (then-Minister of Healthcare) to promote umifenovir, and the unproven claim that Arbidol can speed up recovery from flu or cold by 1.3-2.3 days. They also made claims that the efficacy of umifenovir is supported by peer-reviewed studies.

Names
Arbidol is the INN.

Research 

, umifenovir and darunavir were being studied as a potential combination treatment for COVID-19 in China.

References

External links 
 

Anti-influenza agents
Anti–RNA virus drugs
Indoles
Bromoarenes
Phenols
Dimethylamino compounds
Thioethers
Ethyl esters
Russian drugs
Drugs in the Soviet Union